Lewis Vaughan (born 19 December 1995) is a Scottish footballer who plays as a forward for Scottish Championship club Raith Rovers.

Career
Vaughan started as an under-14 player for Raith Rovers, progressing up the age groups and breaking into the under-19 team.

On 11 January 2012 Vaughan was given a -year professional contract by Raith Rovers, making his debut for the first-team as a sub in the 87th minute in the final match of season 2011–12 season away to Greenock Morton.

On 4 January 2017, Vaughan signed a one-year contract extension with Raith, and on the same date, joined fellow Scottish Championship side Dumbarton on loan until the end of the 2016–17 season. He scored his first goal for he Sons with a solo effort in a 2–2 away draw with Falkirk in February 2017. He scored his fourth goal for the club against Dundee United in a 2–2 draw on 29 April 2017, a result that almost guaranteed Dumbarton's safety with one match to spare.

On 19 January 2019, Vaughan scored a second half hat-trick in a 3–0 win over Dunfermline Athletic in the Scottish Cup – his first professional career hat trick.

Vaughan has suffered four ACL injuries  (two to his right knee and two to his left) in August 2015, January 2019, September 2019 and August 2021, missing several months after being operated on each time. He returned from the fourth rehabilitation in November 2022.

Career statistics

Honours
 Raith Rovers
 Scottish League One : 2019-20
Scottish Challenge Cup : 2021-22

References

External links
 

1995 births
Footballers from Edinburgh
Living people
Raith Rovers F.C. players
Dumbarton F.C. players
Scottish Football League players
Association football midfielders
Scottish footballers
Scottish Professional Football League players